Gremuchy is a rural locality (a settlement) in Kharabali, Kharabalinsky District, Astrakhan Oblast, Russia. The population was 147 as of 2010. There are 6 streets.

Geography 
Gremuchy is located on the Akhtuba River, 17 km southwest of Kharabali (the district's administrative centre) by road. Kharabali is the nearest rural locality.

References 

Rural localities in Kharabalinsky District